The Cheshire Building Society was a building society based in Macclesfield, Cheshire, England. It was the 11th largest building society in the United Kingdom based on total assets of £5 billion on 31 December 2007, prior to merging with the Nationwide Building Society, and was a member of the Building Societies Association. The Cheshire was acquired by Nationwide on 15 December 2008, which was as a result of its approach to the Nationwide in September 2008 regarding a possible merger due to its financial position.

The Cheshire continued to operate as a trading division of the Nationwide until it was fully integrated into its parent in October 2014.

History
Established in 1870 in Macclesfield, the Cheshire was one of the first permanent societies. The Society is the product of thirteen mergers, which began in 1969 when the Cheshire merged with the Northwich Building Society. This was followed by a series of smaller mergers through the 1970s and 1980s. The branch network now extends throughout the North West and includes 49 building society branches and 12 property service branches.

Although a regionally based society, the Cheshire operated nationally following the launch of Internet and intermediary sales channels as well as a customer contact centre located in Macclesfield.

On 8 September 2008, it was announced that the Cheshire, along with the Derbyshire Building Society, had agreed to a merger with the Nationwide Building Society, the largest such institution.

The merger was borne out of increasing fears about the financial security of both the Derbyshire and the Cheshire societies with the former expected to post half-yearly losses of £17 million and the latter posting losses of £10.5 million. As a result of those projected losses, no windfall payments were to be made to savers of the smaller societies (they received greater financial security instead). Unusually, there was no ballot of members on the proposition, after a special resolution under the Building Societies Act enabling a faster merger.

The deal was concluded by the end of 2008 with agreement from the Financial Services Authority and the Office of Fair Trading. The Nationwide initially kept the separate identities of the two societies. The merger was officially completed on 15 December 2008, with the Cheshire's website stating it as a trading division of the Nationwide Building Society.

Following the review in Q2 2010, it was announced that the brand was to be continued but the head office in Macclesfield was to be closed with most staff losing their jobs.

In May 2013, Nationwide announced that the Derbyshire, Cheshire, and Dunfermline brands would be phased out over two years, and branches either rebranded under the Nationwide brand or closed.

Sponsorship
The Cheshire Building Society was the sponsor of Granada Action, ITV Granada's communal help and support advertising campaign, from 1999 until the campaign ended around 2004.

The Cheshire Building Society also became the official club sponsor of Macclesfield Town FC.

References

External links
Cheshire Building Society
Building Societies Association
KPMG Building Societies Database 2008

Banks established in 1870
Organizations established in 1870
Companies based in Cheshire
1870 establishments in England